Mianghundi (mian midst, ghundi refers to mountains) is a small village in Balochistan, Pakistan. It is surrounded by mountains, southwest of Quetta. It is well known for its bowl-like structure and prehistoric status, as it was supposed to be a cantt of the government of Pakistan. 

Mianghundi lies adjacent to the Koh-i-chiltan Koh-i-Apurs Koh-i-Murdar and to the low mountains. 

Chiltan national park lies to the west and Mianghundi national park lies to the north near the Quetta fruit market.

Geography
Mianghundi (Miān Ghundi) is a hill (class T - Hypsographic). A Hill is a rounded elevation of limited extent rising above the surrounding land with local relief of less than 300m.

Its UTM position is UU02 and its Joint Operation Graphics reference is NH42-05. The standard time zone for Mianghundi is UTC/GMT+5.

References

Balochistan
Populated places in Balochistan, Pakistan